Reading East is a constituency represented in the House of Commons of the UK Parliament since 2017 by Matt Rodda, of the Labour Party. The seat is one of two won (held or gained) by a Labour candidate in 2017 from a total of eight covering Berkshire. Rodda's 2017 win was one of 30 net gains of the Labour Party.

The seat has been, relative to others, a semi-marginal seat, and major-swing (volatile) seat since 2010. Its winner's majority has not exceeded 12.9% of the vote since the 15.2% majority won in that year. The seat has changed hands once since 2010.

Constituency profile 
The seat contains the University of Reading and most of its students. The Thames Valley Business Park is in another part of the seat, hosting multinational and cutting-edge technology companies in the software and advanced computer science areas. Adjoining the redeveloped heart of town are a handful mid-rise blocks of ex-council flats and serried ranks of former relatively philanthropic biscuit, brick and seeds manufacturing/processing workers' neat terraces towards the south-centre and east of the town, including firmly Labour-held wards. The suburban north bank of the Thames section takes in Caversham, forming four wards, whilst Earley and Woodley, adding a further three wards, make up strongly-leaning Conservative  wards. Intermediate wards such as Redlands and Park are more marginal including Green Party and Liberal Democrat representation.

History 
The Reading East parliamentary constituency was first contested in 1983, when it was won by a partial incumbent, Gerry Vaughan, a Conservative who was before that election sitting MP for abolished Reading South. He held the seat through two general elections until he retired before the 1997 election.  The constituency was in 1997 won by the Labour Party's Jane Griffiths, thus a backbencher under the Blair Ministry. She retained the seat in the 2001 election but was deselected by her Constituency Labour Party before the 2005 election, when the seat was won by the Tory candidate, Rob Wilson, who held the seat through two elections.  The seat was regained by the Labour Party's candidate in 2017, Matt Rodda, achieving the party's best showing since the seat's creation.  The 2017 result came when there was a hung parliament nationally.  Until 2005 the seat had been a national bellwether. 

Reading East is one of five constituencies, the others being Croydon Central, Enfield Southgate, Leeds North West and Peterborough, which elected Labour MPs in 2017 having not done so since 2001. As of the 2017 general election, the seat is one of two Labour seats from a total of eight seats in Berkshire.

Boundaries and boundary changes 

1983–1997: Formed as a county constituency, largely from parts of the abolished constituency of Reading South.  it also incorporated parts of the abolished borough constituency of Reading North, including Caversham. It comprised the Borough of Reading wards of Abbey, Caversham, Church, Park, Peppard, Redlands, Thames, and Whitley, and the District of Wokingham wards of Arborfield, Barkham, Finchampstead, Shinfield, and Swallowfield.

1997–2010: For the 1997 general election, the constituency lost its southern areas comprising the parts of the District of Wokingham to the County Constituencies of Wokingham (including Shinfield) and Bracknell (Finchampstead), but gained other parts of Wokingham to the east of the Reading.  The boundary with Reading West was realigned, gaining Katesgrove ward and losing Whitley ward. It was redesignated as a Borough Constituency.

The revised constituency comprised the Borough of Reading wards of Abbey, Caversham, Church, Katesgrove, Park, Peppard, Redlands, and Thames, and the District of Wokingham wards of Bulmershe, Loddon, South Lake, and Whitegates.

2010–present: The Borough of Reading wards of Abbey, Caversham, Church, Katesgrove, Mapledurham, Park, Peppard, Redlands, and Thames, and the District of Wokingham wards of Bulmershe and Whitegates, Loddon, and South Lake.

Marginal changes due to revision of local authority wards.

Reading East is bordered by the constituencies of Reading West, Henley, Maidenhead, and Wokingham.

Members of Parliament

Elections

Elections in the 2010s

Elections in the 2000s

Elections in the 1990s

Elections in the 1980s

See also
 List of parliamentary constituencies in Berkshire

Notes

References

Parliamentary constituencies in Berkshire
Politics of Reading, Berkshire
Constituencies of the Parliament of the United Kingdom established in 1983